Rohida is a historic village situated in Sirohi district of Indian state of Rajasthan.
The village is known for Audichya Rodwal Brahman Community residing there.
The Maharaja of Sirohi State has provided the land to the Rodwal Brahmins.
Rohida has been named after King Rohida, the Son of Satayavadi Raja Harish Chandra who lived his last years of life at Rohida.
Rohida is the birthplace of the historian Gaurishankar Hirachand Ojha.
In 1922 Motilal Tejawat started Eki Movement to unit tribals at Rohida.
The village is known for historical temples of Hindu community such as Somnath Mahadev, Rajrajeshwar Mahadev and Sugreeveshwar Mahadev.
After independence, when Panchayati Raj established, the village elected Ravishankar Yagnik, one of freedom fighters from Rodwal community as first Sarpanch (Head of Gram Panchayat) of the village, who also has been elected the first Tehsil Pradhan of the Pindwara Tehsil, after he represented the constituency to Rajasthan Assembly and requested for Backward Status for Sirohi District that has been approved by Assembly. Here, Marwadi language is spoken which is quite similar to Mewadi & Gujarati language in pronunciation and words.
Devnagari script has been used to write the history of Rohida.
Rohida is also related to Lord Parshuram, at the period of Mahabharata, Parshuram visited Rohida and established Lord Shiva temple and named it Jabeshwar Mahadev Mandir which is around 4 km from Rohida.

References 
Rohida village
Rohida PIN
Rohida in freedom movement

Villages in Sirohi district